Belinda Bencic was the defending champion, having won the previous edition in 2019, but she withdrew before the tournament began.

Anett Kontaveit won the title, defeating Ekaterina Alexandrova in the final, 4–6, 6–4, 7–5.

Seeds
The top four seeds received a bye into the second round.

Draw

Finals

Top half

Bottom half

Qualifying

Seeds

Qualifiers

Lucky loser

Qualifying draw

First qualifier

Second qualifier

Third qualifier

Fourth qualifier

Fifth qualifier

Sixth qualifier

References

External links
 Main draw
 Qualifying draw

Kremlin Cup - Singles
2021 Women's Singles